Gau Graig is a subsidiary summit of Cadair Idris in the Snowdonia National Park, in Gwynedd, northwest Wales. It lies to the east of Mynydd Moel on a broad grassy plateau. It marks the eastern end of the Cadair Idris ridge.

The summit is marked by a cairn. To the north are Y Garn and Diffwys, to the west Rhobell Fawr and Aran Fawddwy and to the south are Waun-oer and Cribin Fawr.

References

External links

 www.geograph.co.uk : photos of and from Cadair Idris

Dolgellau
Llanfihangel-y-Pennant
Mountains and hills of Gwynedd
Mountains and hills of Snowdonia
Hewitts of Wales
Nuttalls